Pagliarani is an Italian surname. Notable people with the surname include:

Davide Pagliarani (born 1970), Italian traditionalist Catholic priest
Elio Pagliarani (1927–2012), Italian poet and literary critic

See also
Pagliarini

Italian-language surnames